Doramitzi González Hernández Nació (born January 4, 1983) is a Mexican former Paralympic swimmer and former world record holder.

References

1983 births
Living people
Swimmers from Mexico City
Paralympic swimmers of Mexico
Swimmers at the 2000 Summer Paralympics
Swimmers at the 2004 Summer Paralympics
Swimmers at the 2008 Summer Paralympics
Swimmers at the 2012 Summer Paralympics
Swimmers at the 2016 Summer Paralympics
Medalists at the 2000 Summer Paralympics
Medalists at the 2004 Summer Paralympics
Medalists at the 2008 Summer Paralympics
Paralympic medalists in swimming
Paralympic gold medalists for Mexico
Paralympic silver medalists for Mexico
Paralympic bronze medalists for Mexico
Medalists at the 2011 Parapan American Games
Medalists at the 2015 Parapan American Games
S6-classified Paralympic swimmers